U6 snRNA-associated Sm-like protein LSm8 is a protein that in humans is encoded by the LSM8 gene.

This gene is a member of the LSm family and encodes a protein with a closed barrel shape, made up of five anti-parallel beta strands and an alpha helix. The protein partners with six paralogs to form a heteroheptameric ring which transiently binds RNAs and is involved in the general maturation of RNA in the nucleus.

Interactions
LSM8 has been shown to interact with LSM2.

References

Further reading